The Embassy of the Republic of Turkey in Beirut (Turkish: Türkiye Cumhuriyeti Beyrut Büyükelçiliği) is Turkey's diplomatic mission to Lebanon. It was established in 1946. The embassy hosts several sub-division offices including  the Military Attaché, Counsellor of Security Cooperation and Interior Affairs, Counsellor for Commercial Affairs.

References 

Diplomatic missions of Turkey
Diplomatic missions in Lebanon